The Arakan Liberation Army (abbreviated ALA) is a Rakhine insurgent group in Myanmar (Burma). It is the armed wing of the Arakan Liberation Party (ALP). The ALA signed a ceasefire agreement with the government of Myanmar on 5 April 2012.

History

1968–1969 
The Arakan Liberation Army (ALA) was founded on 20 November 1968 with the help of the Karen National Union (KNU), which organised, trained, and supplied the ALA with ammunition and vehicles. On 26 November 1968, Khai Ray Khai, a member of the ALP's central committee, along with nine other associates, were arrested in Sittwe, the capital of Rakhine State, by Burmese authorities. In December 1968, several arrests of the ALP's leaders led to the dissolution of the ALA and the ALP.

1971–1977 
Between 1971 and 1972, former political prisoners from the ALP were released on amnesty. As soon as Khaing Moe Lunn, a former ALP political prisoner, was released, he departed to the village of Komura to meet with KNU leaders in order to re-establish the ALA. From 1973 to 1974, the ALA was re-established with help from the KNU, and 300 fighters were recruited and trained, with Lunn as commander-in-chief of the ALA.

Between April and May 1977, 120 ALA fighters led by Lunn engaged with the Indian Armed Forces and the Tatmadaw (Myanmar Armed Forces) at the India-Myanmar border. Ten ALA fighters were killed, including Lunn, over 70 were arrested by Indian and Burmese authorities, and 40 were disarmed and arrested. An additional 20 went missing during retreats from government forces, and 30 of the arrested were executed by shooting. A further 55 others were charged with treason under Article 122 of the then constitution; 11 of them were sentenced to death, and the rest to life imprisonment. The group ceased to exist once again, as it became increasingly risky to operate illegally.

1980–present 
In 1980, all ALA prisoners were released on amnesty. In 1981, the ALA was once again re-established and assisted by the KNU. The ALA was then led under the new leadership of Khai Ray Khai. Presently, the ALA campaigns on a nationalist agenda, and has been openly hostile towards the Rohingya ethnic minority in Rakhine State, claiming that they are not natives of the region, but illegal immigrants from Bangladesh.

References 

Rebel groups in Myanmar
Paramilitary organisations based in Myanmar